Zenivio Morientes Gostavo Conceição Mota (born 22 April 2005 in Ainaro), simply known as Zenivio Mota or just Zenivio is a Timorese footballer currently playing for SLB Laulara of the Primeira Divisão, and the Timor-Leste national team.

International career
Zenivio made four appearances during 2020 AFC U-16 Championship qualification. He scored one goal in the team's Group Stage victory over Macau. In October 2021 he appeared in all three of Timor-Leste's 2022 AFC U-23 Asian Cup qualification matches. In the final match of the Group Stage he scored his team's only goal in a 1–0 victory over the Philippines. 

Two months later on 5 December 2021 Zenivio made his senior international debut in a 2020 AFF Championship match against Thailand at age 16. He made three appearances in the competition, all as a substitute.

International career statistics

References

External links
Soccerway profile
National Football Teams profile

2005 births
Living people
East Timorese footballers
Timor-Leste international footballers
Association football forwards
Competitors at the 2021 Southeast Asian Games
Southeast Asian Games competitors for East Timor